Strzyżew may refer to the following places:
Strzyżew, Ostrów Wielkopolski County in Greater Poland Voivodeship (west-central Poland)
Strzyżew, Lublin Voivodeship (east Poland)
Strzyżew, Masovian Voivodeship (east-central Poland)
Strzyżew, Pleszew County in Greater Poland Voivodeship (west-central Poland)